Sri Lankan Moors (formerly Ceylon Moors; colloquially referred to as Sri Lankan Muslims) are an ethnic minority group in Sri Lanka, comprising 9.2% of the country's total population. Most of them are native speakers of the Tamil language who also speak Sinhalese as a second language. They are predominantly followers of Islam. The Sri Lankan Muslim community is divided as Sri Lankan Moors, Indian Moors and Sri Lankan Malays depending on their history and traditions.

The Sri Lankan Moors are of diverse origins with some tracing their ancestry to Arab traders who first settled in Sri Lanka around the 9th century, and who intermarried with local Tamil and Sinhala women. Recent genetic studies, however, have suggested a predominant Indian origin for Moors compared to the Arab origin speculated by some. Perera et al. (2021) in their genetic analysis of the Moors stated the following in their report: "In contrast, Sri Lankan Moors have descended exclusively from Muslim male merchants of either Arabic or of Indian origin, who came to Sri Lanka for trading. During the fourteenth century, they started to settle in coastal areas in Sri Lanka and espoused local women, who were either Sinhalese or Sri Lankan Tamil". The concentration of Moors is the highest in the Ampara, Trincomalee and Batticaloa districts.

Etymology 

The Portuguese called the Muslims in India and Sri Lanka Mouros, after the Muslim Moors known to them in Iberia. The word Moors did not exist in Sri Lanka before the arrival of the Portuguese colonists. The term 'Moor' was chosen because of the Islamic faith of these people and was not a reflection of their origin.

The Tamil term Sonakar along with the Sinhala term Yonaka, has been thought to have been derived from the term Yona, a term originally applied to Greeks, but sometimes also Arabs and other West Asians. Historically, all Tamil speaking Muslim communities in India and Sri Lanka were known as the Sonakar.

History

Origins theories 
Many Sri Lankan Moors are Marakkars, and share the same history with Tamil Nadu Marakkars in particular, and Marakkars from Kerala. This can be seen from the large number of prominent Sri Lankan Moors who hold the surname of Marikkar (and its variations) and through the extremely strong linguistic and cultural similarities held by these communities. It is said there has been a strong relationship between Marakkar communities through endogamous marriages. The similarities have been described as "enormous" by M. M. M. Mahroof.

Some scholars hold the view that the Sri Lankan Moors in general are descended from the Marakkar, Mappilas, Memons, Lebbes, Rowthers and Pathans of South India.

Sri Lankan Moor scholar Dr. Ameer Ali in his summary of the origin history of Sri Lankan Moors states the following:

Historian Patrick Peebles states by the end of the 19th century Sri Lankan Muslims comprised about 6–7 percent of the population, and that "the majority of Muslims were of South Indian origin and spoke Tamil."

Another view suggests that the Arab traders, however, adopted the Sinhalese and Tamil languages only after settling in Sri Lanka. The cultural practices of the Moors also vary significantly from the other communities on the island, but share much in common with the Tamil Muslims of Tamil Nadu. This view is dominantly held by the Sinhalese-favouring section of the Moors, as well as the Sri Lankan government, which lists the Moors as a separate ethnic community.

Although the caste system is not observed by the Moors as it is by the other ethnic groups in Sri Lanka, their kudi system (matriclan system) is an extension of the Tamil tradition.

Medieval era 
The Sri Lankan Moors along with Mukkuvar dominated once in medieval era the pearl trade in Sri Lanka. Alliances and intermarriages between both communities were observed in this period. They held close contact with other Muslims of Southern India through coastal trade.

The Moors had their own court of justice for settling their disputes. Upon the arrival of the Portuguese colonisers in the 16th century, a large population of Moors was expelled from cities such as the capital city Colombo, which had been a Moor-dominated city at that time. The Moors migrated to the eastern part of the island, and settled there through the invitation of the Kingdom of Kandy. Robert Knox, a British sea captain of the 17th century, noted that the Kings of Kandy built mosques for the Moors. Sri Lanka being a predominately agricultural economy, International trade was underdeveloped during the medieval period. The arrival and settlement of Arab-Muslim merchants on the island's coastal regions initiated overseas trade and helped unlock the country's economic potential.

Sri Lankan Civil War 

The Sri Lankan Civil War was a 26-year conflict fought on the island of Sri Lanka between government and separatist militant organisation Liberation Tigers of Tamil Eelam (the LTTE, also known as the Tamil Tigers). The LTTE tried to create an independent Tamil state called Tamil Eelam in north-east Sri Lanka.

Since 1888 under the initiative of Ponnambalam Ramanathan, the Sri Lankan Tamils launched a campaign to classify those Sri Lankan Moors who spoke Tamil as Tamils, primarily to bolster their population numbers for the impending transition to democratic rule in Sri Lanka. Their view holds that the Sri Lankan Moors were mainly Tamil converts to Islam. The claim that the Moors were the progeny of the original Arab settlers might hold good for a few families, but not for the entire bulk of the community.

According to some Tamil nationalists, the concept of Arab descent among Tamil-speaking Moors was invented just to keep the community away from the Tamils, and this 'separate identity' intended to check the latter's demand for the separate state Tamil Eelam and to flare up hostilities between the two groups in the broader Tamil-Sinhalese conflict.

The expulsion of the Muslims from the Northern province was an act of ethnic cleansing carried out by the Tamil militant Liberation Tigers of Tamil Eelam (LTTE) organization in October 1990. in Northern Sri Lanka, the LTTE forcibly expelled the Muslim population at gunpoint from the Northern Province and confiscated their properties. Yogi, the LTTE's political spokesman claimed that this expulsion was carried out in retaliation for atrocities committed against Tamils in the Eastern Province by Muslims, who were seen by the LTTE as collaborators with the Sri Lankan Army.
The forced expulsion by LTTE still carries bitter memories among Sri Lanka's Muslims. In 2002, the LTTE militant leader Vellupillai Prabhakaran formally apologized for the expulsion of the Muslims from the North. There has been a stream of Muslims travelling to and from Jaffna since the ceasefire. Some families have returned and the re-opened the Osmania College now has 60 students enrolled. Osmania College was once a prominent educational institution for the city's Muslim community. According to a Jaffna Muslim source, there is a floating population of about 2,000 Muslims in Jaffna. Around 1,500 are Jaffna Muslims, while the rest are Muslim traders from other areas. About 10 Muslim shops are functioning and the numbers are slowly growing.

Genetic Studies 

Dr Sarabjit Mastanain finding in 1996 based on genetic analysis of Human blood group systems from 508 individuals states cophenetic correlation was 0.8956 and it indicates Sinhalese & Tamil as native population. Also, it reflects on genetic distance among five populations of Sri Lanka as per given below eigenvector plot of the R-matrix.

According to a study published in 2021 using 16 X-chromosomal short tandem repeat markers (STRs) conducted on 838 unrelated individuals from the four major ethnicities, there is a sex biased demographic history among Sri Lankan ethnicities. According to analysis of molecular variance, Sinhalese, Sri Lankan Tamils and Moors are highly panmictic but Indian Tamils had statistically significant genetic subdivision from both Sinhalese and Moors. According to the genetic distance calculated the Moors were closest to Sinhalese and then Sri Lankan Tamil with a significant distance from Indian Tamils. The Nei genetic distance for Sinhalese and Moors is 0.0123, SL Tamil and Moors is 0.0233 while Indian Tamil and Moors 0.0293. The study was carried on the X-STRs DXS10148, DXS10135, DXS8378, DXS7132, DXS10079, DXS10074, DXS10075, DXS6801, DXS6809, DXS6789, DXS7424, DXS101, DXS7133, DXS9902, HPRTB and DXS7423.

Society

Demographics 

Sri Lankan Moor Population and Percentage

Language 

Depending on where they live in the country, they may also additionally speak Tamil, Sinhala and or English. According to the 2012 Census 58.7% or 862,397 Sri Lankan Moors also spoke Sinhala and 30.4% or 446,146 Sri Lankan Moors also spoke English. Moorish Tamil bears the influence of Arabic.

Sri Lankan Muslim Tamil 

The vast majority of Sri Lankan Muslims speak Tamil as their mother tongue. Religious sermons are delivered in Tamil even in regions where Tamil is not the majority language. Islamic Tamil literature has a thousand-year heritage.

The Tamil dialect spoken by Muslims in Sri Lanka is identified as Sri Lankan Muslim Tamil (SLMT). It is a social dialect of Sri Lankan Tamil that falls under the larger category of the colloquial variety of Tamil. SLMT has distinct phonological, morphological and lexical differences in comparison to other varieties of SLT since it is influenced by the Arabic language. Due to this, we can see the use of several Persian-Arabic loan words in SLMT vocabulary. This distinctiveness between SLMT and other spoken varieties of SLT brings out the different religious and cultural identities of the Tamil speaking ethnic groups.

As an example, the SLT term for the corpse is ‘caavu’ but the SLMT uses the Arabic term ‘mayyatu’. Another example is the verb ‘pray’ which is ‘vanaku’ in SLT and ‘tholu’ in SLMT. The kinship terms used by Muslims in the country are also different when compared with the SLT terms, but are shared with Tamil Muslims of Tamil Nadu. The following are some terms that show the difference between SLMT and most varieties of SLT/Tamil.

Interestingly, one can also notice ethno-regional variations in SLMT and categorise them into two major sub-dialects such as North-Eastern Muslim Tamil (NEMT) and Southern Muslim Tamil (SMT). SMT is found in the Southern, Western, and Central provinces with some variations and other linguistic features within it. As an example, Muslims in the Western province, especially in Colombo tend to code-mix their speech with Tamil and English terms.

On the other hand, NEMT is found in Northern and Eastern provinces. One phonological variation between these two sub-dialects is that SMT replaces the Tamil sound /sa/ with /sha/. Another phonological variation is that SMT uses voiced plosives such as /b, d, j, g/ whereas NEMT uses voiceless plosives such as /v, p, t, c, k/ instead of them.

Another symbolic representation of the Southern variety is the shortening of Tamil verbs. As an example, the verb ‘to come’ known as ‘varukhudu’ in SLT/NEMT would be shortened and pronounced as ‘varudu.’

Furthermore, the Moors like their counterparts in Tamil Nadu, use the Arwi which is a written register of the Tamil language with the use of the Arabic alphabet. The Arwi alphabet is unique to the Muslims of Tamil Nadu and Sri Lanka, hinting at erstwhile close relations between the Tamil Muslims across the two territories.

However, SLMT is only a spoken variety that is limited to the domestic sphere of the community members and is something shared with the Marrakar community of Tamil Nadu. In addition, they frequently tend to code-switch and code-mix when they communicate with a non-Muslim or a fellow Muslim in a different region.

Culture 
The Sri Lankan Moors have been strongly shaped by Islamic culture, with many customs and practices according to Islamic law. While preserving many of their ancestral South Asian customs, the Moors have over time adopted several Arabic-Islamic practices.

The Moors practice several customs and beliefs which they closely share with the Arab, Sri Lankan Tamils, and Sinhalese People. Tamil and Sinhala customs such as wearing the Thaali or eating Kiribath were widely prevalent among the Moors. Arab customs such as congregational eating using a large shared plate called the 'sahn' and wearing of the North African fez during marriage ceremonies feed to the view that Moors are of mixed Sinhalese, Tamil, and Arab heritage.

There has been a growing trend amongst Moors to rediscover their Arab heritage and reinstating the Arab customs that are the norm amongst Arabs in the Middle East and North Africa. These include replacing the sari and other traditional clothing associated with Sinhalese and Tamil culture in favour of the abaya and hijab by the women as well as increased interest in learning Arabic and appetite for Arab food by opening restaurants and takeaways that serve Arab food such as shawarma and Arab bread.

The late 19th century saw the phase of Islamization of Sri Lankan Moors, primarily under the influence of M. C. Siddi Lebbe. He was a leading figure in the Islamic revival movement, and strengthened the Muslim identity of the Sri Lankan Moors. He was responsible for the ideological framework for the Muslim ethnicity in Sri Lanka.

See also 
 Islam in Sri Lanka
 Indian Moors
 List of Sri Lankan Moors
 Sri Lankan Malays
 List of Sri Lankan Malays
 Memons in Sri Lanka

References

Citations

Bibliography

Further reading
 Victor C. de Munck. Experiencing History Small: An analysis of political, economic and social change in a Sri Lankan village. History & Mathematics: Historical Dynamics and Development of Complex Societies. Edited by Peter Turchin, Leonid Grinin, Andrey Korotayev, and Victor C. de Munck, pp. 154–169. Moscow: KomKniga, 2006. 

 
Islam in Sri Lanka
Sri Lankan Muslims
Tamils of Sri Lanka
Arabs in Sri Lanka
Muslim ethnoreligious groups